The Rapperswil–Ziegelbrücke railway line is a single-track standard-gauge railway line in Switzerland.

History
The line was built as an extension of the Wallisellen–Uster–Rapperswil railway (Glatthalbahn), which had been extended from Wetzikon to Rüti on 15 August 1858 after its acquisition by the VSB. The line was opened at the same time as the Murg–Sargans line. The intervening section between Weesen and Murg was not completed until 1 July 1859. The line shortened the distance between Zurich and Chur. Its importance as a long-distance line was reduced by the opening on 20 September 1875 by the Swiss Northeast Railway (Schweizerische Nordostbahn) of the Lake Zürich left-bank railway, which runs from Zürich to Näfels via  and Ziegelbrücke. As a result, the Rapperswil–Ziegelbrücke line was never duplicated. It experienced increased use Between Rapperswil and Uznach with the opening of the Uznach–Wattwil railway on 1 October 1910. 
 
Electrification of the line was completed on 7 May 1927 at 15 kV AC 162/3 Hz. Electrification of the line between Uznach and Ziegelbrücke (continuing to Linthal) followed on 15 May 1933.

Route 
The line follows the right bank of the Obersee at the upper end of Lake Zurich from Rapperswil to near . The line has no major engineering structures.
 

Operations
The whole line is served every hour by services on line S6 of the St. Gallen S-Bahn on the Rapperswil–Ziegelbrücke– route; these services continued to  until December 2013. The Rapperswil–Uznach section is used by the hourly Voralpen-Express services. These stop in Rapperswil, Schmerikon and Uznach.
 
Freight trains have not generally used the line since 2006, when Uznach was closed for freight traffic. However, the line is regularly used for nocturnal diversions for work on the Pfäffikon––Ziegelbrücke line.

Rolling stock
The regional service between Rapperswil and Linthal was operated for decades after the electrification with fir green trains, which were hauled by Ae 3/6 I and Ae 4/7 locomotives. These were replaced in the late 1980s and early 1990s by Neuer Pendelzug (new push-pull trains, NPZ) RBDe 4/4 sets, which are nicknamed "Hummingbirds" because of their colourful paintwork. The rolling stock now consists only of NPZ "Domino 3" push-pull trains, which are coupled in the rush hour to form 6-car sets.

Notes

References

External links 

 2021 timetable

Railway lines in Switzerland
Railway lines opened in 1859
1859 establishments in Switzerland
Swiss Federal Railways lines
15 kV AC railway electrification